Tiparpur is a small village of Vikasnagar mandal, Dehradun district in the Indian state of Uttarakhand. It is located 25 km from Dehradun ISBT. It is situated on Shimla Bypass road.  It is located in the middle of Shivalik hills and Aasan river.
Selaqui industrial area is 10 km from Tiperpur.

Tiparpur is located 16 km distance from its Mandal Main Town Vikasnagar. Tiparpur is 23.7 km far from its District Main City Dehradun . It is 25 km far from its State Main City Dehradun.

Nearby villages are Sabhawala (.9 km), Jatowala (1.3 km), Majri (2 km), Mednipur Badripur (2.9 km), Sahaspur (3 km). Nearest towns are Sahaspur (3 km), Vikasnagar (16 km), Kalsi (18.9 km), Dehradun (27.9 km),

Vikasnagar, Adu Wala, Aitan Bag, Amabadi, Babu Garh, Badama Wala, ... . are the villages along with this village in the same Vikasnagar Mandal

Demographics
The total population of the village is 2356. The male population is 1255 and female population is 1101 with sex ratio 877 per 1000 male. the literacy rate is 50.92%. the male literacy rate is 65.51% and female literacy is 33.92% as per government record.

Villages in Dehradun district